Emil Horaţiu Hurezeanu (born August 26, 1955, in Sibiu, Sibiu County, Romania) is a Romanian journalist and writer. He has served as Romania's ambassador in Germany since 5 May 2015. Since 19 May 2021, he has been accredited as ambassador of Romania in Austria by incumbent President Klaus Iohannis.

Education 
He graduated from the Law School of Babeş-Bolyai University in Cluj-Napoca (1975–1979). Then, he worked as jurist in Alba County (1980–1981) and Mediaș (1981–1982) and at Eminescu Bookshop in Sibiu (1981). Between 1981 and 1982, he studied at Vienna and in October 1983, Hurezeanu obtained political asylum in West Germany.

Journalistic activity 
For more than a decade, he worked for the Romanian department of Radio Free Europe (1983–1994), in Munich. Also, after 1985, he studied political science at the University of Virginia and in 1990 he graduated from Boston University. He was the director of the Romanian department of Radio Free Europe for a few months in 1994. Then, he worked as director of the Romanian section of the Deutsche Welle from Cologne (1995–2002). Having returned to Romania for good in 2002, he was a personal adviser to Romanian Prime Minister Adrian Năstase (March–September 2003). In Romania, he worked for Antena 1, Radio Europa FM, România Liberă, and Realitatea TV. Hurezeanu was director of the Realitatea-Caţavencu trust in Romania between February 1, 2009, and October 2010.

In 2008, Emil Hurezeanu was among the 500 richest Romanians, with an estimated wealth of €6-7 million.

Family 
Emil (or Emilian) Hurezeanu's mother, Paraschiva, was a teacher and his father, Ion, was an engineer. Emil Hurezeanu has a brother, Mihai Hurezeanu.

He is a distant relative of writer Ion Negoițescu (1921–1993).

In 2004, Hurezeanu married Rucsandra (b. Şipoş in Târgu Mureş, 1974), a pharmacist by training. She studied the pharmaceutical marketing at 
Ecole Supérieure de Commerce de Paris and is the daughter of Mioara Şipoş, one of the most important businesswomen in Mureș County and Transylvania. They have two sons, Luca (b. 2005) and Toma (b. 2008).

Also, Hurezeanu has an older child from a previous relationship, Joachim, who lives in France.

Works 
 Lecţia de anatomie (1979)
 Între câine şi lup (1996)
 Cutia Neagră (1997)
 Cetatile fortificate din Transilvania (2009). Editorial Artec.
 Pe trecerea timpului: Jurnal politic românesc, 1996–2015 (2015)

References

External links
https://openlibrary.org/a/OL365882A
 Revista Cariere: Emil Hurezeanu – Redescoperirea Arcadiei 

1955 births
People from Sibiu
Romanian essayists
Babeș-Bolyai University alumni
Boston University alumni
University of Virginia alumni
Romanian textbook writers
Romanian jurists
Romanian journalists
Romanian civil servants
Radio Free Europe/Radio Liberty people
Romanian dissidents
Romanian defectors
Romanian expatriates in Germany
Living people
Ambassadors of Romania to Germany
Ambassadors of Romania to Austria
Commanders Crosses of the Order of Merit of the Federal Republic of Germany